Netaji Subhas University of Technology (East Campus), formerly AIACTR, is a premier engineering institute located in Geeta Colony, Delhi, India.

History 

It started operating from the campus in 2008. The institute was earlier affiliated to GGSIPU now Delhi government has retrieved this affiliation and now the institute comes under the Netaji Subhas University Of Technology [as of 2020]. The first batch under NSUT started from 2020 onwards.

Programmes

Undergraduate (BTech) 

NSUT EAST CAMPUS offers bachelor's degree in three areas:

 Btech-Electronics and Communication Engineering(with specialization in artificial intelligence and machine learning)
 Btech-Computer Science and Engineering (with specialization in the Internet of Things)
 Btech-Computer Science and Engineering (with specialization in Big Data Analytics)

Postgraduate (MTech) 

NSUT EAST CAMPUS offers master's degrees in the following areas:

 Mtech- Digital Communication (DC)
 Mtech- Information Security (IS)
 Mtech- Artificial Intelligence (AI)
 Mtech- Very Large Scale Integration (VLSI)

Administrative website links 

  NSUT [MAIN CAMPUS] WEB SITE LINK
  NSUT [EAST CAMPUS] WEB SITE LINK

Reference links 

Universities and colleges in Delhi
2008 establishments in Delhi
Educational institutions established in 2008